The year 2011 is the third year in the history of BAMMA, a mixed martial arts promotion based in the United Kingdom. In 2011 BAMMA held 4 events beginning with, BAMMA 5: Daley vs. Shirai.

Title fights

Events list

BAMMA 5: Daley vs. Shirai

BAMMA 5: Daley vs. Shirai was an event held on February 26, 2011 at MEN Arena in Manchester, England, United Kingdom.

Results

BAMMA 6: Watson vs. Rua

BAMMA 6: Watson vs. Rua was an event held on May 21, 2011 at Wembley Arena in London, England, United Kingdom.

Results

BAMMA 7: Trigg vs. Wallhead

BAMMA 7: Trigg vs. Wallhead was an event held on September 10, 2011 at National Indoor Arena in Birmingham, England, United Kingdom.

Results

BAMMA 8: Manuwa vs. Rea

BAMMA 8: Manuwa vs. Rea was an event held on December 10, 2011 at Capital FM Arena in Nottingham, England, United Kingdom.

Results

References

BAMMA events
2011 in mixed martial arts